Center Hill, also known as Corinth or Old Corinth, is a town in Houston County, Texas, United States.  It is 1.5 miles from Kennard.  The population was 105 in 2000.

References

Unincorporated communities in Houston County, Texas
Unincorporated communities in Texas